Sarva (Sarwa) is a rural locality (a village) and the administrative centre of Sarvinsky Selsoviet, Nurimanovsky District, Bashkortostan, Russia. The population was 271 as of 2010. There are 6 streets.

Geography 
Sarva is located 27 km east of Krasnaya Gorka (the district's administrative centre) by road. Tiryakle is the nearest rural locality.

References 

Rural localities in Nurimanovsky District